Kevin John Buckley (born January 16, 1959) is an American former Major League Baseball (MLB) player who played for the Texas Rangers in 1984.

A native of Quincy, Massachusetts, Buckley attended Braintree High School prior to attending the University of Maine. In 1978, he played collegiate summer baseball with the Cotuit Kettleers of the Cape Cod Baseball League. With Maine's baseball team, Buckley appeared in the 1981 College World Series. Drafted in the 17th round of the 1981 Major League Baseball draft, Buckley made his major league debut with the Texas Rangers on September 4, 1984. Appearing in 5 career games as a designated hitter, Buckley went 2–7 with 4 strike outs.

References

External links
Baseball Reference
Baseball Reference (Minors)
Baseball Gauge
Retrosheet
Venezuelan Professional Baseball League

1959 births
Living people
Baseball catchers
Baseball players from Massachusetts
Burlington Rangers players
Cotuit Kettleers players
Gulf Coast Rangers players
Las Vegas Stars (baseball) players
Leones del Caracas players
American expatriate baseball players in Venezuela
Maine Black Bears baseball players
Maine Guides players
Major League Baseball designated hitters
Oklahoma City 89ers players
Sportspeople from Quincy, Massachusetts
Texas Rangers players
Tulsa Drillers players
Braintree High School alumni